Alvaro Pascual-Leone (born 7 August 1961 in Valencia, Spain) is a Spanish-American Professor of Neurology at Harvard Medical School, with which he has been affiliated since 1997. He is currently a Senior Scientist at the Hinda and Arthur Marcus Institute for Aging Research at Hebrew SeniorLife. He was previously the Director of the Berenson-Allen Center for Noninvasive Brain Stimulation and Program Director of the Harvard-Thorndike Clinical Research Center of the Beth Israel Deaconess Medical Center in Boston.

Career
Dr. Pascual-Leone obtained his school education in Deutsche Schule Valencia between 1967 and 1979. After getting his Abitur in 1979, he started medical school in Freiburg, Germany. He obtained an M.D. and a Ph.D. in Neurophysiology in 1984 and 1985 respectively, both from the Faculty of Medicine of Freiburg University in Germany. He also trained at the University of Minnesota and the US National Institutes of Health.

Pascual-Leone is a world leader in the development of transcranial magnetic stimulation for application in cognitive neuroscience and for therapeutic applications in neurology, psychiatry and neurorehabilitation. Pascual-Leone's research projects aim at understanding the mechanisms that control brain plasticity across the lifespan to be able to modify them for the subject’s optimal behavioral outcome. Pascual-Leone combines various brain imaging and brain stimulation methodologies to establish a causal relationship and a precise chronometry between regional brain activation and behavior, and uses noninvasive brain stimulation techniques to modulate brain plasticity, suppressing some changes and enhancing others, to gain a clinical benefit and behavioral advantage for a given individual. Such non-invasive approaches can lead to clinically relevant therapeutic effects in neuropsychiatry and neurorehabilitation, and serve as proof-of-principle prior to more invasive neuromodulatory interventions.

Family
Pascual-Leone lives in Wayland, Massachusetts, with his wife Elizabeth and their three children. His father is Alvaro Pascual-Leone Pascual and his mother is Teresa Garcia Ferrer.

Awards and honours
He has authored over 700 scientific papers  and has received several international honors and awards, including the Ramon y Cajal Award in Neuroscience (Spain), the Norman Geschwind Prize in Behavioral Neurology from the American Academy of Neurology, the Friedrich Wilhelm Bessel Research Award from The Alexander von Humboldt Foundation (Germany), and the Jean Signoret Prize from the Ipsen Foundation (France). In 2000, he won the Daniel D. Federman Outstanding Clinical Educator Award. He is a member of the Spanish Royal Academy of Pharmacy.

External links
 VIDEO - Learning about Seeing from the Blind Dr. Alvaro Pascual-Leone speaks at the University of Wisconsin.
 Center for Noninvasive Brain Stimulation
 Minds and Magnets: An experimental treatment offers promise for some patients whose depression resists standard medications and shock therapy., Newsweek, December 11, 2006 - features Dr. Pascual-Leone and transcranial magnetic stimulation

References

1961 births
Living people
People from Valencia
Harvard University faculty
Spanish neurologists
University of Freiburg alumni